The Pilipinas VisMin Super Cup, is a professional basketball league in the Philippines. The league comprises teams from the Visayas and Mindanao regions of the Philippines. The league is the first basketball league to be based in the Visayas–Mindanao region since the Mindanao Visayas Basketball Association (MVBA), which merged with the National Basketball Conference in 2008 to form Liga Pilipinas, which folded in 2011.

As with its predecessors, the league aims to find and scout talent from southern Philippines (which comprises the Visayas and Mindanao regions).

The first tournament for the inaugural season of the Pilipinas VisMin Super Cup opened on April 9, 2021. Due to the effects of the COVID-19 pandemic in the Philippines, at least its first conference will be held in a bio-secure bubble, with Alcantara, Cebu and Pagadian City serving as hubs for Visayas- and Mindanao-based teams, respectively. Cebu City was supposed to host the bubble for Visayas teams, but due to the rising cases of COVID-19 in the city and its surrounding localities, the town of Alcantara, located roughly 100 kilometers southwest of Cebu City, was chosen as replacement host.

Format
The Pilipinas VisMin Super Cup 1st Conference in 2021 has two phases, the divisional tournaments and the Southern Finals. Participating teams are divided into divisions in the first phase, where they only play teams within their geographic region (e.g. Visayas-based teams will only play against fellow Visayas-based teams; Mindanao-based teams will play only against fellow Mindanao-based teams). The Southern Finals, acts as the league's grand finals where the champions of the Visayas and Mindanao divisions face off against each other.

Originally there was a plan to hold two tournaments (or conferences as customarily known in the Philippines) within a season: the All-Filipino Conference & the other was the Reinforced Conference were imports are allowed to play. In addition, teams are also required to have at least six "home-grown" players: players who are from the general area the team is representing.

Teams
The Pilipinas VisMin Super Cup consists entirely of teams from the Visayas and Mindanao regions of the Philippines.

Current teams (2022)

Former teams

 Notes

List of champions

Overall champions

Division champions

Visayas

Mindanao

See also
 Philippine Basketball Association
 Maharlika Pilipinas Basketball League
 NBL
 Pilipinas Super League
 Filbasket
 Chooks-to-Go Pilipinas 3x3

External links
 
 Pilipinas VisMin Super Cup on FIBA Live Stats - Genius Sports

References

Basketball leagues in the Philippines
2020 establishments in the Philippines
Sports leagues established in 2020